Janet Milne Rae (née Gibb; 8 July 1844 – 24 April 1933) usually known as Mrs. Milne Rae, was a Scottish novelist and missionary born at Willowbank, Aberdeen. She began to write fiction while living in India, beginning with Morag: A Tale of Highland Life in 1872.

Life
Janet Gibb lost her mother, Margaret Smith, at the age of 12 and her civil engineer father, Alexander Gibb, at the age of 20. She married a graduate of the University of Aberdeen, Rev. George Milne Rae, and the couple went out as missionaries to Madras, India. There her husband taught at the university and at Madras Christian College. They returned to Edinburgh in about 1891.

Back in Scotland, George Milne Rea published The Syrian Church in India (1892) and Connection between Old and New Testaments (1904), and was prominent in the United Free Church of Scotland. In the first of those books, he argued against the theory that St Thomas the Apostle had preached in India, explaining the assertion as an example of a tradition migrating with the people who believed in it, the Nestorians. He died in 1917. Mrs Milne Rae died in Edinburgh in 1933.

The Milne Raes had four children, of whom the third, Lettice Milne Rea (1882–1959), was likewise a novelist and also a local historian. Their eldest daughter, Olive Rae (1878–1933), became an Edwardian musical comedy actress in London and on tour in Britain.

Works
Rae began to write "middlebrow" novels and shorter works of fiction while she was in India, her first being Morag: A Tale of Highland Life (London: James Nesbit & Co., 1872). Her other fiction includes Hartleigh Towers, a Story of English Life (London: W. Isbister, 1880), Dan Stapleton's Last Race (London: Marshall Japp & Co., c. 1881), Rinaultrie (T. Nelson & Sons, 1887), A Book for Young Women. Marion's Story; or, Softly All My Years (T. Nelson & Sons, 1887), Bride Lorraine (London: Leisure Hour Monthly Library, c. 1905), The Testing of Clem (London: RTS, 1909), A Bottle in the Smoke. A Tale of Anglo-Indian Life (London: Hodder & Stoughton, 1912), The Whipping Boy, etc. (Gay & Hancock, 1914), The Awakening of Priscilla (Stirling: Drummond's Twopenny Stories, 1929) and Geordie's Tryst. A Tale of Scottish Life (London: RTS, n. d.) She was also the editor of The Life Beautiful. A Selection of Passages from Faber (1907).

References

External links

Geordie's Tryst

1844 births
1933 deaths
19th-century British women writers
19th-century British writers
20th-century British women writers
Scottish women writers
Scottish Presbyterian missionaries
Presbyterian missionaries in India
Female Christian missionaries
Burials at the Dean Cemetery